Inês Teixeira Pereira (born 26 May 1999) is a Portuguese footballer who plays as a goalkeeper for Swiss side Servette. She has appeared for the Portugal women's national team.

Club career
After starting her career in the Campeonato Nacional Feminino with G.D. Estoril Praia, Pereira returned to her home city of Lisbon with Sporting CP where she signed in the summer of 2016.

At the end of each of her first two seasons at the club, Sporting were crowned champions and Pereira became a regular in the first team with the team winning 36 of her 40 starts during her five seasons at the club. When the team failed to secure Champions League football at the end of the 2020–21 season, Pereira chose to sign for Swiss champions Servette where she instantly became the number one goalkeeper and kept back-to-back clean sheets in the club's first two qualification fixtures of the Champions League campaign.

International career
Pereira has been capped for the Portugal national team, appearing for the team during the 2019 FIFA Women's World Cup qualifying cycle. Pereira also started and kept a clean sheet for Portugal in the decisive qualification game for UEFA Women's Euro 2022; however, her team were eliminated 1–0 on aggregate and initially failed to qualify for the tournament before eventually taking the place from Russia who were removed and banned from FIFA and UEFA International matches after Russia's invasion of Ukraine.

Honours 
Sporting
 Campeonato Nacional Feminino: 2016–17, 2017–18

References

External links
 
 
 
 
 Inês Pereira at Sporting CP 

1999 births
Living people
Portuguese women's footballers
Portugal women's international footballers
Women's association football goalkeepers
Campeonato Nacional de Futebol Feminino players
Sporting CP (women's football) players
Footballers from Lisbon
UEFA Women's Euro 2022 players
Expatriate women's footballers in Switzerland
Portuguese expatriate women's footballers
Portuguese expatriate sportspeople in Switzerland
Servette FC Chênois Féminin players